Daniel Owen James (born 10 November 1997) is a professional footballer who plays as a winger for Premier League club Fulham, on loan from Leeds United. Born in England, he represents the Wales national team.

James made his professional debut for Swansea City in February 2018, and signed for Manchester United in June 2019. He made 74 appearances for the club, before joining Leeds United in August 2021.

He made his senior Wales debut in November 2018, having previously represented the nation at various youth levels, and was part of their squad at UEFA Euro 2020. James also helped Wales qualify for the FIFA World Cup in 2022 for the first time since 1958.

Early life
James was born in Kingston upon Hull, East Riding of Yorkshire, to Elaine and Kevan James. He was raised in the nearby village of South Cave and attended South Hunsley School in Melton.

Club career

Swansea City

Youth and beginnings
A highly regarded prospect of the Hull City academy side, James joined Swansea City in 2014 for an initial fee of £72,000, immediately becoming part of their U18 academy side. By the 2016–17 season, James had become an integral part of the Swansea U23 side who gained promotion to the PDL Division 1, winning the league by an 11-point margin. Additionally, James contributed to the side winning the Premier League Cup, and reaching the semi-finals of the Premier League International Cup and the quarter-finals of the EFL Trophy.

Following his impressive displays in the development squad, James was included in the first-team squad for the first time in January 2016 for the FA Cup defeat to Oxford United. Although James did not make an appearance off the bench, his progress was deemed sufficient for him to be offered a new three-year contract the following week. He was again named on the bench for a Premier League fixture against Stoke City in October 2016.

On 30 June 2017, James signed for League One club Shrewsbury Town on loan until the end of the season. His loan deal was terminated by mutual consent on 31 August 2017, after he failed to force his way into the starting 11. James' only inclusion in a matchday squad was as an unused substitute in an EFL Cup first round tie against Nottingham Forest.

First team breakthrough
On 6 February 2018, he made his Swansea first-team debut as a late substitute, scoring in the 82nd minute of an 8–1 FA Cup victory over Notts County.

He made his league debut for Swansea on 17 August 2018 in a 0–0 draw against Birmingham City in the EFL Championship. He scored his first league goal for the club on 24 November 2018 in a 4–1 home defeat against Norwich City. In December 2018, with James now a regular and one of the standout performers for Swansea, manager Graham Potter revealed that the club were looking to open talks with James over a new contract. Despite discussion of a move to Leeds United during the January 2019 transfer window, James was named in the starting line-up for Swansea against Birmingham City on 29 January, with James scoring his second goal of the season in a 3–3 draw.

On 31 January 2019, with James expressing his desire to leave Swansea to join Leeds United, a structured £10 million fee was agreed between the two clubs, James agreed terms and completed the medical at Leeds, and was at Elland Road conducting signing interviews and announcement photoshoots ahead of the deal being completed. However, after speculation of a disagreement between Swansea owners and their chairman regarding the structure of the deal only an hour before the transfer window's 11 pm deadline, James was left at Elland Road awaiting the deal to be signed off by Swansea, with the window closing at 11 pm.

After Swansea failed to complete the deal, James' agent said it was "very disappointing", stating: "Swansea made no attempt to keep the player and at the first sign of money they couldn't show him the door quickly enough." At the end of the 2018–19 season, with Leeds missing out on automatic promotion, Leeds head coach Marcelo Bielsa said that he refused to blame the club for missing out on James, but said, "I'm not underlying the importance of the absence of James".

Manchester United

On 6 June 2019, James underwent a medical with Premier League club Manchester United ahead of a transfer for a reported fee of £15 million with the potential for additional payments. After agreeing a deal "in principle" on 7 June, United announced the signing of James on a five-year contract on 12 June, with an option to extend for a further year. He scored his first goal for the club on his competitive debut, coming on as a substitute to score United's final goal in a 4–0 win over Chelsea. He also scored in United's 2–1 loss against Crystal Palace. In only his fourth game for United he scored his third goal for the club in a 1–1 draw with Southampton, which was later voted goal of the month by United fans. James was also voted United player of the month for August. In March 2020, Daniel James ended a seven-month goal drought by scoring in a 5–0 win over Austrian team LASK, the final game before the suspension of football caused by the COVID-19 pandemic.

On 20 December 2020, James scored his first league goal of the season in a 6–2 win against Leeds United. On 2 February 2021, he scored United's Premier League record-equalling goal in the 9–0 home win against Southampton.

Leeds United
James signed for Premier League rivals Leeds United on 31 August 2021 for an undisclosed fee on a five-year contract, having nearly joined the club two-and-a-half years prior to the transfer. Many news outlets were reporting the fee to be £25 million. He scored his first Premier League goal for Leeds on 21 November 2021, in the team's 2–1 loss at the Tottenham Hotspur Stadium.

On 11 May 2022, James was sent off during Leeds United's Premier League match against Chelsea for a challenge on Mateo Kovacic.

Loan to Fulham
On 1 September 2022, James was loaned out to Premier League club Fulham until the end of the 2022–23 season.

International career

Youth levels
Born in England, James qualifies to play for Wales through his late father, Kevan, who was born in Aberdare. James scored at the Toulon Tournament playing for Wales U20 in a 1–0 win over Bahrain U20 after he won and scored the resulting penalty.

Senior team
James received his first senior call-up for the 2018 FIFA World Cup qualifying game against Serbia in 2017 by manager Chris Coleman and subsequently made his full Wales debut under Coleman's successor, Ryan Giggs, in a match against Albania in November 2018, playing the first 58 minutes of the game. James scored his first Wales goal in only his second cap, netting the only goal of the game in the opening minutes against Slovakia in his competitive home debut. During the September international break, James netted the only goal in a friendly win against Belarus. In May 2021, he was selected for the Wales squad for the delayed UEFA Euro 2020 tournament. In November 2022, he was named in the Wales squad for the 2022 FIFA World Cup.

Style of play
James can play as a winger, and also as an attacking midfielder. He is known for his pace and skill.

Career statistics

Club

International

Wales' score listed first, score column indicates score after each James goal

Honours
Swansea City U23
Premier League 2 Division 2: 2016–17
Premier League Cup: 2016–17

Manchester United
UEFA Europa League runner-up: 2020–21

Individual
Swansea City Best Newcomer of the Year: 2018–19
Swansea City Community Champion: 2018–19
Manchester United Player of the Month: August 2019

References

External links

1997 births
Living people
Footballers from Kingston upon Hull
English footballers
Welsh footballers
Wales youth international footballers
Wales under-21 international footballers
Wales international footballers
Association football wingers
Association football midfielders
Hull City A.F.C. players
Swansea City A.F.C. players
Shrewsbury Town F.C. players
Manchester United F.C. players
Leeds United F.C. players
Fulham F.C. players
English Football League players
Premier League players
UEFA Euro 2020 players
2022 FIFA World Cup players
English people of Welsh descent